The avian family Rallidae comprise the rails, crakes, and coots. The International Ornithological Committee (IOC) recognizes these 152 species distributed among 45 genera, 24 of which have only one species. Twenty-one of the  species in the list have gone extinct since A.D. 1500; they are marked (E).

This list is presented according to the IOC taxonomic sequence and can also be sorted alphabetically by common name and binomial.

List

References

Rail